Varazze is a comune (municipality) in the Province of Savona in the Italian region of Liguria, located about  west of Genoa and about  northeast of Savona in the Riviera di Ponente. Nearby in the Ligurian Apennines is the Monte Beigua with its Natural Regional Park.

Economy is predominantly based on the shipyards, yachting and tourism.

History
The burgh grew around the former Roman station named Ad Navalia. In the Middle Ages, Varazze was disputed between Savona and Genoa, due to its notable ships production. In 1227, it became an independent commune but, after a short seigniory of the Malocello, it was sold to the Republic of Genoa in 1290.

In 1525, Hugo of Moncada, admiral of emperor Charles V, was defeated here in a naval battle and taken prisoner. Varazze followed the history of Genoa until it was captured by French troops in 1798. In 1815 it became part of the Kingdom of Sardinia.  In 1861, it became part of the newly unified Kingdom of Italy.

Main sights
Romanesque church of San Nazario e Celso (rebuilt in the 16th century). The façade is from 1870.
Church of San Domenico (1419). It includes Sienese school frescoes and a 16th-century polyptych. Notable is the cloister.
Church of Sant'Ambrogio. It has a Romanesque façade and a campanile in Gothic-Romanesque style with three orders of mullioned windows. In the interior are a polyptych by Giovanni Barbagelata and a panel by Luca Cambiaso with the Madonna and Sts. John the Baptist and Francis.
Church of Santa Maria in Latronorio, in the frazione Invrea. A pointed portal remains of the original 12th-century edifice. The interior is home to a large 13th-century fresco.
Eremo del Deserto ("Hermitage of the Desert"), in the woodland towards the Ligurian Apennine.
Church of San Donato, from the 5th or 9th century, but mostly rebuilt in the 19th century.
Remains of the medieval walls

The so-called Passeggiata Europa ("Europa Stroll") is a naturalistic path running on the former Genoa-Ventimiglia railway (closed in 1970), connecting Varazze to Cogoleto. It passes through rocky Maquis shrubland landscape including Aleppo Pine vegetation, and overlooks a series of small sea harbours housing rich wildlife.

Twin towns — sister cities
Varazze is twinned with:

  Palmi, Italy

Notable people 
People from Varazze include:
 Jacobus de Voragine (c. 1230–1298), Italian chronicler, archbishop of Genoa and author of the Golden Legend.
 Francesco Cilea (1866–1950), opera composer, lived the last years of his life in Varazze, where he was Honorary Citizen.
 Lelio Basso (1903–1978), anti-fascist, politician and journalist.
 Raimondo Spiazzi (1918–2002) theologian, advisor to Pius XII and mariologist, lived the last years of his life in Varazze.

References

External links
 Official website

Cities and towns in Liguria